Central Broward Park & Broward County Stadium, formerly Central Broward Regional Park and Central Broward Stadium, is a large county park in Lauderhill, Florida, and the only dedicated cricket stadium in the United States. It is owned and operated by Broward County.  It opened on November 9, 2007, at a construction cost of $70 million. It is located at the corner of US 441 and State Road 838 (Sunrise Blvd.). 

The stadium was the first U.S. cricket pitch to receive certification by the International Cricket Council (ICC) to host international matches; it hosted its first international Twenty20 series in 2010, featuring New Zealand and Sri Lanka. In September 2019, the stadium hosted the United States' first-ever One Day International (ODI) series, which included the United States' first ODI victory.

Main Event Field

Cricket

The Main Event Field was designed with cricket in mind. It features a large circular grass field, roughly 167 yards (153 meters) diameter. Surrounding it is a 5,000-seat stadium and large berms capable of holding 15,000 more.  It also features stadium lighting and a luxury viewing area. It was the first venue in the United States officially certified by the International Cricket Council (ICC) for One Day International (ODI) play.

The first organized cricket event held there was a Twenty20 cricket tournament, the Martin Luther King Twenty20 Cricket Tournament (MLK T20), from January 18–20, 2008.  The event featured local players from India, Pakistan and the West Indies.  The first international tournament hosted was another Twenty20 tournament, the MAQ T20 International Cricket Tournament, on May 23–25, 2008.  That event featured teams from Canada, Pakistan, the West Indies, and the rest of the world, including former superstars such as Javed Miandad, Richie Richardson, and Mohammed Azharuddin.

The park also hosted the first full cricket international matches on American soil, a two-match Twenty20 series between New Zealand and Sri Lanka, on May 22 and May 23 2010.  The series was drawn 1-1, a low-scoring affair (the highest total by either team was New Zealand's 120/7 in the first game), with a healthy and supportive crowd, as well as the fine-quality facilities (allowing for the exception of substandard lighting, which resulted in the cancellation of an originally scheduled night match).

On June 30 and July 1 2012, New Zealand and the West Indies played 2 T20 Internationals at this ground, with the Windies winning both matches convincingly. In 2016, the West Indies-based Caribbean Premier League played multiple matches at the park during the second half of July.

On August 2, 2016, India and the West Indies announced that they would play a two-match T20 series on August 27 and 28, marking India's first international matches on American soil, as an addendum to India's tour of the Caribbean. Ahead of the start of the series, Indian coach and retired star leg-spin bowler Anil Kumble said about the park, "I certainly didn't expect the facilities to be as good as what it is in the United States. I certainly felt that it could be a makeshift. I had heard about Florida and this ground, but very impressed with the facilities that we have seen today."

Only one match produced a result, with the second match ending in a no result due to rain and a technical delay. In the first match of the series, India's KL Rahul scored the second-fastest T20I century off only 46 balls, eventually finishing on 110 not out for the highest international score in the venue's history. The two teams also posted the highest international innings totals in the venue's history, with the West Indies winning by one run (245/6 off 20 overs against 244/4 off 20 overs) thanks to Evin Lewis' own century (100 off 49 balls).

It also hosted two T20I matches between the West Indies and Bangladesh in August 2018.

In 2019, it also played host to two of the three T20I matches in the T20I Series in the a tour of the West Indies by India. The first T20I held on August 3, 2019, was a low scoring match between the teams. India opted to field first and restricted West Indies to a total of 95. India struggled to get there but managed to win the match by 4 wickets. The second T20I, held on the next day was won by the Indian cricket team by 22 runs (D/L Method) in a match which had its second innings curtailed due to lightning and heavy rain.

In September 2019, the venue hosted the United States Tri-Nation Series, part of the 2019–22 ICC Cricket World Cup League 2—marking the first One Day International (ODI) matches to ever be held in the United States, and the U.S. national team's first-ever ODI win.

Association Football 
The Main Event Field began hosting the Floridians FC, a soccer team in the Premier Development League, in 2015.

In 2016, The Main Event Field was also home of Fort Lauderdale Strikers of the now defunct North American Soccer League.

The stadium was the home of Storm FC of the NPSL during the 2021 season (postponed from the 2020 season due to the COVID-19 pandemic).

Australian Rules Football 
The Main Event Field was the home of the Fort Lauderdale Fighting Squids of the United States Australian Football League in 2008.

In 2015 the venue hosted the 10th edition of the 49th Parallel Cup, an annual Australian Football match between the US and Canada.

Other sports
The mayor of Lauderhill, Richard J. Kaplan, sent a letter to ICC chief executive Dave Richardson in April 2013, stating that the council was looking at redeveloping the cricket stadium into a multi-sports facility, due to the lack of income and marquee events that have recently been held at the Field.

It also hosted the United States national rugby union team's home leg in their 2011 Rugby World Cup qualifier against Uruguay on November 21, 2009. With a win in Uruguay in the first leg, the USA already secured its place in New Zealand with a 27–6 win.

The Fort Lauderdale Barracudas of the Stars Football League played their three home games at the park during the 2012 season. The league played all of its games at the stadium for the 2013 season.

Other amenities
The park also has two large artificial turf practice fields.  They can be split into four American football or association football pitches, or combined into two cricket pitches.  It also features standard playgrounds, a 1.5-mile walking trail, and basketball, netball and tennis courts.  A water park—Tropical Splash—opened in March 2008.

The park is also home to the MLS Combine, the future stars of Major League Soccer since its inception in 2011.

List of centuries

One Day International centuries
The following table summarises the One-day International centuries scored at the site.

Twenty20 International centuries

The following table summarises the Twenty20 International centuries scored at the site.

International five-wicket hauls

A single five-wicket haul has been taken on the ground in international matches. Namibian bowler Zhivago Groenewald took five wickets for the cost of 20 runs against the United States in a One Day International match in 2019.

References

External links
 Official website

Australian rules football grounds
Cricket grounds in the United States
Rugby union stadiums in Florida
Major League Lacrosse venues
Parks in Broward County, Florida
North American Soccer League stadiums
Fort Lauderdale Eagles football
Defunct National Premier Soccer League stadiums
2007 establishments in Florida
Sports venues completed in 2007
Soccer venues in Florida
Sports complexes in Florida
Cricket in Florida